Andrei Răuță (born 4 July 1995) is a Romanian professional footballer who plays as a defender for Liga II club Metaloglobus București. In his career, Răuță also played for teams such as Bucovina Pojorâta, CS Balotești, Academica Clinceni or Petrolul Ploiești, among others.

Club career

Racing Colombes & Guingamp
Răuță grew up in Racing Colombes Academy and made its debut at professional level for second team of En Avant de Guingamp.

Bucovina Pojorâta & Balotești
In the following years Răuță played in the Romanian second league for teams such as Bucovina Pojorâta, CS Balotești and Academica Clinceni, managing to promote in the Liga I with the last one.

Academica Clinceni
He made its debut in the Liga I on 14 July 2019, for Academica Clinceni, in a 2-3 defeat against CS Universitatea Craiova.

Petrolul Ploiești
On 13 February 2020, Răuță signed a one-and-a-half-year contract with Romanian club Petrolul Ploiești. On 20 January 2021, Răuță was released from the club after having his contract mutually terminated.

Universitatea Cluj
On 26 January 2021, Răuță joined Universitatea Cluj.

References

External links
 
 
 Andrei Răuță at lpf.ro

1995 births
Living people
People from Roman, Romania
Romanian footballers
Romania youth international footballers
Association football defenders
Racing Club de France Football players
Championnat National 2 players
En Avant Guingamp players
Liga I players
FC Astra Giurgiu players
LPS HD Clinceni players
Liga II players
CS Balotești players
FC Petrolul Ploiești players
FC Universitatea Cluj players
FC Metaloglobus București players
Romanian expatriate footballers
Romanian expatriate sportspeople in France
Expatriate footballers in France